Cross Anchor is a small unincorporated community in north-central Greene County, Tennessee. It is located north of Greeneville and south of Baileyton.

References

Unincorporated communities in Tennessee
Unincorporated communities in Greene County, Tennessee